Forever Knight is a Canadian television series created by Barney Cohen and James D. Parriott. The series aired on CBS from 5 May 1992 to 17 May 1996, broadcasting three seasons and a total of 70 episodes. There were no new episodes shown during the entire 1993–94 TV season. The show is an adaptation of a made-for-television film, Nick Knight, which premiered on 20 August 1989. CBS initially declined to option the film for a television series. In the summer of 1992, the series was picked up with all but one of the actors being replaced and the storyline for the film acting as the first two episodes of the series. Forever Knight follows the life of Nick Knight (Geraint Wyn Davies), an 800-year-old vampire who works as a police detective in modern-day Toronto, seeking redemption for the lives he has taken over the years and struggling for a way to become mortal again.

Series overview

Episodes

Television movie (1989)

Season 1 (1992–93)

Season 2 (1994–95) 
Between Seasons 1 and 2, Nick and Schanke change to a new precinct under a new captain but continue to work with Natalie at crime scenes.

Season 3 (1995–96)

References

External links
 
 

Lists of action television series episodes
Lists of Canadian drama television series episodes
Lists of crime television series episodes
Lists of fantasy television series episodes
Lists of science fiction television series episodes
Forever Knight